Éric William N'Jo Léa (born 15 July 1962) is a French former professional footballer who played as a forward for Stade Brestois 29, Paris Saint-Germain, RC Lens and Stade Malherbe Caen.

Personal life
His father was the Cameroonian former footballer Eugène N'Jo Léa.

References

External links
 

1962 births
Living people
Association football forwards
French footballers
Footballers from Paris
French sportspeople of Cameroonian descent
Stade Brestois 29 players
Paris Saint-Germain F.C. players
RC Lens players
Stade Malherbe Caen players
Ligue 1 players